Dhimitër Xhuvani (1934–2009) was an Albanian writer and screenwriter.

Biography 
Xhuvani was born in 1934 in Pogradec. His father, Kostaq Xhuvani, was a respected teacher from Elbasan. In 1944, during World War II, his family fled from Pogradec and took refuge in Mokër, where they stayed until their country was liberated, after which they moved to Elbasan. After finishing medical high-school he worked in the rural hospitals of Librazhd, Peqin, Gramsh, and Cërrik. After leaving medicine he continued his studies in the Faculty of History and Philology in Tiranë and later in Moscow.

Dhimitër is the winner of many literary awards, and his work has been translated in many languages including Italian, French, English, Russian, Japanese and Chinese.

He died in Tirana of natural causes at the age of 75.

Works 
 Kambanat e fundit (1958)
 Midis dy netëve (1962)
 Tuneli (1966)
 Përsëri në këmbë (1970)
 Fan Smajli (1971)
 Zgjimi i Nebi Surrelit (1976)
 Do të jetojmë ndryshe (1979)
 Vdekja e zotit Kaloti (1981)
 Bota ime (1984)

External links

References 

1934 births
2009 deaths
Albanian male writers
20th-century Albanian writers
21st-century Albanian writers
People from Pogradec
Albanian screenwriters
Xhuvani family
20th-century screenwriters